Bird Creek is a  long 2nd order tributary to the Banister River in Pittsylvania County, Virginia.

Course 
Bird Creek rises in a pond about 4 miles northeast of Java, Virginia and then flows northeast to join the Banister River about 3 miles south-southeast of Mt. Airy.

Watershed 
Bird Creek drains  of area, receives about 45.3 in/year of precipitation, has a wetness index of 403.63, and is about 53% forested.

See also 
 List of Virginia Rivers

References 

Rivers of Virginia
Rivers of Pittsylvania County, Virginia
Tributaries of the Roanoke River